Together is a collaborative studio album by Australian singer Marina Prior and Mark Vincent. The album was released through Sony Music Australia on 15 April 2016 and peaked at number 5 on the ARIA Albums Chart three weeks later.

The two are set to tour in support of the album from September to November 2016 with the Two Heavenly Voices – One Magical Evening tour. The tour was announced in March 2016.

Background and release
Upon release, Mark said; "I was so excited to work with Marina, I've always wanted to work with her... singing together created such a great bond between us and we've become great friends. I think that shows in the songs we sing on Together...there's an honesty between us."
Marina added; "You have to be on the same wavelength, you have to be 'simpatico' and feel things together. I think that we do that musically, but I also think that we click personally. Music is just an extension of who you are, really. The work has to be true for it to resonate."

The duo performed "The Prayer" live on Sunrise on 3 May.

Track listing
 "The Prayer" - 5:28
 "Time to Say Goodbye" - 4:08
 "Quizás, Quizás, Quizás" - 3:06
 "Libiamo ne' lieti calici" - 4:15
 "The Music of the Night" - 2:54
 "I Hate You Then I Love You" - 4:43
 "All I Ask of You" - 3:20
 "Amigos Para Siempre" - 3:55
 "Somos Novios" - 4:17
 "E Più Ti Penso" - 4:33
 "I Vow to Thee, My Country" - 4:26
 "La Vie en rose" - 2:26

Charts

Weekly charts

Year-end charts

Release history

References

2016 albums
Marina Prior albums
Mark Vincent albums
Sony Music Australia albums
Vocal duet albums